Anima is a 2003 short-film directed and written by Erika Grediaga. Produced by the American Film Institute, it stars Mexican actress Claudia Soberón.

The story is based on some of the legends about monastic life during the colonial period in Latin America.

Plot 
16th century. The Catholic Church has expanded throughout the new continent, Nueva España. New monasteries are being built, but the missionaries’ Holy cities are threatened by forces unknown: the earth shakes, buildings collapse, nothing is spared. The devout seek protection by strengthening their faith—some even willing to sacrifice themselves.

One hundred years later, poverty forces young Angelica (Claudia Soberón) into God's service against her will. Rebellious, Angelica tries to escape into the outside world—closed behind the convent's doors, sealed by her vows. As punishment, Angelica is confined to her cell where she is haunted by the spirit of Sister Luciana (Katira Santiago). The ghost, a nun entombed one hundred years in the convent walls, compels Angelica to free her trapped soul.

To release Luciana, Angelica will have to persuade the nuns to leave the convent and pray in the open, but to leave the cloister is expressly forbidden.

Cast
Claudia Soberón Angelica
Carol Abney Mother Superior
Dennis Deal Brother Matheo Bonilla
Rick Simon Father Francisco
Katira Alvarez Sor Luciana de Jesus
Melodee Spevack Ignacia, Angelica's mother

Production
Anima was produced at the AFI Conservatory in partial fulfillment of the requirements for the Master of Fine Arts Degree or Certificate of Completion. Erika Grediaga (AFI Directing Fellow) Ismail Ahmed (AFI Editing Fellow), James W. Thompson Jr. (AFI Production Design Fellow), Jitsu Toyoda (AFI Cinematography Fellow) and José Carlos Mangual (AFI Producing Fellow) got their master's degree in 2003. Of note, "Anima" means "Soul" in Latin.

Principal Screenings & Festivals
Los Angeles (world premiere) (US premiere)
San Diego Latino Film Festival 2004
AFI Conservatory Showcase 2004
Los Angeles Latino International Film Festival 2004
Palm Springs International Short Film Festival 2004
Lake Arrowhead Film Festival 2004
Montreal Ibero American Film Festival 2004 (Canadian premiere)
Trieste Festival of Latin-American Cinema 2004 (European Premiere)
Hollywood International Student Film Festival 2005
Reel Women International Film Festival 2005
Mexico City Horror Film Festival (Latin American premiere)

Awards and nominations
 Imagen Foundation Awards 2004: Best Theatrical Short or Student Film - Nominated (Erika Grediaga)
 Hollywood International Student Film Festival 2005: Best Cinematography - Winner (Jitsu Toyoda)

External links

2003 films
2003 short films